Arctosa raptor is a species of wolf spiders in the family Lycosidae. It is found in Russia, Nepal, the USA, and Canada.

References

 Bradley, Richard A. (2012). Common Spiders of North America. University of California Press.
 Ubick, Darrell (2005). Spiders of North America: An Identification Manual. American Arachnological Society.

External links

 NCBI Taxonomy Browser, Arctosa raptor

raptor
Spiders described in 1885